Stalldown Barrow, sometimes called Staldon, is a megalithic site in Devon, about 5 km from Harford. It consists of a long stone row. It is fairly close to the stone circle on Stall Moor.

History of Devon
Barrows in the United Kingdom
Archaeological sites in Devon
Megalithic monuments in England
Bronze Age sites in Devon